is the highest mountain of the Shokanbetsudake Mountains. It is located on the border between Hokuryū, Shintotsukawa and Mashike, Hokkaidō, Japan.

Geology
Mount Shokanbetsu is made from non-alkaline mafic volcanic rock.

References 

Shokanbetsu